Petasina bakowskii is a species of air-breathing land snail, a terrestrial pulmonate gastropod mollusk in the family Hygromiidae, the hairy snails and their allies.

Distribution 
This species occurs in Slovakia, Ukraine and other countries.

References

Petasina